Levasseur or leVasseur or Le Vasseur or variant may refer to:

People
 Levasseur (surname)

Places
 Levasseur Inlet, Nunavut, Canada
 René-Levasseur Island, Quebec, Canada
 6170 Levasseur, asteroid discovered in 1981

Other uses
 Pierre Levasseur (aircraft builder), French aircraft manufacturer

See also 
 Vasseur (surname)